INS Dunagiri is the fourth ship of the  stealth guided missile frigates being built by Garden Reach Shipbuilders and Engineers for the Indian Navy. The ship was laid down on 24 January 2020 and it was launched on 15 July 2022.

See also
 Future of the Indian Navy

References

Frigates of the Indian Navy
Indian Navy
Nilgiri-class frigates
2022 ships